The 2020–21 Syed Mushtaq Ali Trophy was the twelfth season of the Syed Mushtaq Ali Trophy, a Twenty20 cricket tournament played in India. It was contested by 38 teams, divided into six groups, with six teams in Group A. Jammu & Kashmir, Karnataka, Punjab, Railways, Tripura and Uttar Pradesh were placed in Group A, with all the matches taking place in Bengaluru. Punjab won Group A to qualify for the knockout stage of the tournament. Karnataka also qualified for the quarter-finals, finishing as one of the best two second placed teams across groups A to E.

Points table

Fixtures

Round 1

Round 2

Round 3

Round 4

Round 5

References

Syed Mushtaq Ali Trophy
Syed Mushtaq Ali Trophy
Syed Mushtaq Ali